Bernard of Cluny (or, of Morlaix or Morlay) was a twelfth-century French  Benedictine monk, best known as the author of De contemptu mundi (On Contempt for the World), a long verse satire in Latin.

Life
Bernard's family of origin and place of birth are not known for certain.  Some medieval sources list Morlaàs in Béarn, as his birthplace.  However, in some records from that period he is called Morlanensis, which would indicate that he was a native of Morlaix in Brittany. A writer in the Journal of Theological Studies (1907), Volume 8, pages 394–399, contended that he belonged to the family of the seigneurs of Montpellier in Languedoc, and was born at Murles.  It is believed that he was at first a monk of Saint-Sauveur d'Aniane and that he entered the monastery of Cluny during the administration of Abbot Pons (1109–1122).

Works
Bernard is best known as the author of De contemptu mundi (On Contempt for the World), a 3,000 verse poem of stinging satire directed against the secular and religious failings he observed in the world around him.  He spares no one; priests, nuns, bishops, monks, and even Rome itself are mercilessly scourged for their shortcomings. For this reason it was first printed by Matthias Flacius in Varia poemata de corrupto ecclesiae statu (Basle, 1557) as one of his testes veritatis, or witnesses of the deep-seated corruption of medieval society and of the Church, and was often reprinted by Protestants in the course of the seventeenth and eighteenth centuries.

Bernard of Cluny also wrote the twelfth century hymn  "Omni die dic Mariae" (Daily, daily sing to Mary). Several of Bernard's sermons and a theological treatise, Dialogue (Colloquium) on the Trinity are extant, as is a c. 1140 poem which he dedicated to the monastery's abbot Peter the Venerable (1122–1156).

Hymns
 'Hic breve vivitur'
 'Hora novissima'
 'O hona patria'
 'Urbs Sion aurea'

Bibliography 
 Bernardus Morlanensis, De contemptu mundi, Une vision du monde vers 1144 - Bernard le Clunisien. Latin text with French transl., introduction and commentary by André Cresson. (Témoins de notre histoire) Turnhout 2009.
 Bernardi Cluniacensis Carmina de Trinitate et de fide catholica (Studia Latina Stockholmiensia). Stokholm, 1963.
 Scorn for the world: Bernard of Cluny's De contemptu mundi. Latin text with engl. transl. and introd. by Ronald E. Pepin. Colleagues Press, East Lansing, Michigan, 1991.
 The Scorn of the World: A Poem in Three Books, transl. and ed. by Henry Preble and Samuel Macauley Jackson. The American Journal of Theology vol. 10,1 (1906), pp. 72–101 (prologus and book 1) online, vol. 10,2 (1906), S. 286–308 (book 2) online, vol. 10,3 (1906), S. 496–516 (book 3) online.

References

 Scorn for the world: Bernard of Cluny's De contemptu mundi. Latin Text with engl. transl. and introd. by Ronald E. Pepin. Colleagues Press, East Lansing, Michigan, 1991.
 Bernardus Morlanensis, De contemptu mundi, Une vision du monde vers 1144 - Bernard le Clunisien. Latin Text, French transl., introd. and annotations by André Cresson. (Témoins de notre histoire) Turnhout 2009.

External links

 
 
 

Cluniacs
Christian apocalyptic writings
12th-century Latin writers
Medieval Latin poets
French Benedictines
12th-century French writers
12th-century French poets